The 1987 Atlantic Coast Conference men's basketball tournament took place in Landover, Maryland, at the Capital Centre. NC State defeated North Carolina, 68–67 to win the championship. Vinny Del Negro of NC State was named tournament MVP. NC State defeated all three of their in-state rivals on their way to the tournament championship, beating Duke in the quarterfinal round, Wake Forest in the semifinal, and North Carolina in the championship game.

Bracket

References

Tournament
ACC men's basketball tournament
College basketball tournaments in Maryland
Landover, Maryland
ACC men's basketball tournament
ACC men's basketball tournament